Archibald George Montgomerie, 18th Earl of Eglinton and 6th Earl of Winton (27 August 1939 – 14 June 2018), styled Lord Montgomerie until 1966, was the son of Archibald William Alexander Montgomerie, 17th Earl of Eglinton, and Ursula Joan Watson.

Career
Lord Eglinton was educated at Eton and went on to a career in the City of London as a member of the London Stock Exchange. 

He joined the stockbrokers Grieveson Grant, where he became senior dealer in the fixed interest market, with a focus on short-dated gilts, and by the age of 24 was a partner in the firm, remaining in post from 1957 to 1972. He then joined another firm, Gerrard and National, as managing director, and was also deputy chairman by 1980. This firm was merged into Gerrard Vivian Gray, of which he was chairman from 1992 to 1994. He then moved on to be chairman of the Edinburgh Investment Trust PLC and was a director of other investment trusts, including Hong Kong Investment Trust and Dunedin Income Growth Fund.

Marriage and issue
He married Marion Carolina Dunn-Yarker, daughter of John Henry Dunn-Yarker and Elizabeth Adrienne Pinching, on 7 February 1964. They have four sons:

 Hugh Archibald William Montgomerie, 19th Earl of Eglinton (born 24 July 1966); married twice and has a son
 Hon. William John Montgomerie (born 4 October 1968); married with issue
 Hon. James David Montgomerie (born 1972); married with issue
 Hon. Robert Seton Montgomerie (born 1975)

The Countess is a Patroness of the Royal Caledonian Ball. The family seat is at Balhomie House, near Cargill, in Perthshire.

Freemasonry
Eglinton was initiated into freemasonry in Lodge Mother Kilwinning No. 0, under the Grand Lodge of Scotland.  He subsequently joined United Lodge of Prudence No.83 under the United Grand Lodge of England, and was appointed Senior Grand Warden in 1971, and served as Assistant Grand Master from 1989 until 1995.

Ancestry

See also
 Eglinton Castle

References

External links

1939 births
2018 deaths
People educated at Eton College
18
Place of birth missing

Clan Montgomery
Scottish Freemasons
Eglinton